Boyapati Srinivas, commonly known as Boyapati Srinu or Boyapati Sreenu, is an Indian film director and screenwriter. Best known for directing mass action films in Telugu cinema, Boyapati has garnered two state Nandi Awards.

Early life
Boyapati Srinivas was born in Pedakakani in Guntur district, Andhra Pradesh. He obtained his degree from JKC College in Guntur and attended Nagarjuna University for post-graduation. His family runs a photo studio. Boyapati was interested in photography and worked as a part-time reporter for the Eenadu newspaper. To pursue a career in films, he moved to Hyderabad and his cousin Posani Krishna Murali recommended Boyapati to work in the direction department of Muthyala Subbaiah studio in 1997. Boyapati worked with Subbaiah for films like Oka Chinna Maata, Gokulamlo Seeta, Pelli Chesukundam, Pavitra Prema, Annayya and Manasunna Maaraju.

Boyapati is married to Vilekha, and the couple has three children.

Career 
In 2005, Boyapati made his directorial debut with Bhadra, which starred Ravi Teja, Meera Jasmine, and Prakash Raj. Tulasi was his second film. In 2010, Boyapati's third release was Simha, starring Nandamuri Balakrishna in a dual role alongside Nayanthara and Sneha Ullal. In 2012, he made his fourth film Dammu, starring Jr NTR, Trisha and Karthika Nair. Later in 2014, Boyapati reunited with Balakrishna for Legend  which opened to positive reviews with critics opining that he has delivered a "mass, masala entertainer with some sentimental touch that will appeal to both the classes and the masses."

Filmography

Awards

Nandi Awards 
Nandi Award for Best Director - Legend  - (2014)
B. N. Reddy National Award - (2016)

Santosham Film Awards 

 Best Director - Sarrainodu at 15th Santosham Film Awards in 2017

References

External links
 
 

Telugu film directors
Living people
Year of birth missing (living people)
Telugu screenwriters
Nandi Award winners
Screenwriters from Andhra Pradesh
Film directors from Andhra Pradesh
People from Guntur district
21st-century Indian film directors
Indian film directors
Indian directors
Santosham Film Awards winners
CineMAA Awards winners